Jacob Kohler may refer to:

 Jacob Kohler (Ontario politician) (1860–?), Ontario farmer and political figure
 Jacob A. Kohler (1835–1916), Republican politician from the state of Ohio
 Jacob Johann Köhler (1698–1757), Estonian printer